The WWWF United States Tag Team Championship was the first version of the main tag team title in the World Wide Wrestling Federation from 1963 until 1967. Originally, the WWWF was a member of the National Wrestling Alliance operating out of the Northeast and was called the Capitol Wrestling Corporation. The championship began as Capitol Wrestling's territorial version of the NWA United States Tag Team Championship from 1958 until 1963.

Reigns

Names

Reigns

Combined reigns

By team

By wrestler 
Key

See also 

 List of former championships in WWE
 Tag team championships in WWE
 Professional wrestling in the United States

Notes

References

External links
 WWWF United States Tag Team Championship

National Wrestling Alliance championships
United States professional wrestling championships
WWE tag team championships